"No Tengo Dinero" (English: "I Have No Money") is the debut single of Danish musical group Los Umbrellos, considered to be their signature song. It was released by FLEX Records (now part of EMI) on 14 May 1997. Based on the theme of 1960 film Never on Sunday by Greek composer Manos Hadjidakis, the lyrics were written by Jay and Richie Balmorian and group member Al Agami. It was produced by Kenneth Bager, Michael Pfundheller and Jan Elhøj, with additional production handled by Cutfather & Joe.

The song became a top-five hit in Denmark, Italy, New Zealand and Switzerland. In Austria, the song reached number one for ten weeks, received a Platinum certification from IFPI, and was the highest-selling single of 1998. The song also peaked at number 31 on Canada's RPM Top Singles chart and number 42 on the US Billboard Hot 100; it stayed on the latter chart for 27 weeks without entering the top 40. As of August 2003, the single had sold 800,000 copies worldwide. Unlike the band's following releases, "No Tengo Dinero" enjoyed chart success, thus Los Umbrellos were named a one hit wonder.

Background
In 1995, Jan Elhøj and Anders Hansen, of rap-comedy duo Angry Ass, made a song called "Frikadeller og krebinetter" (Danish for "Meatballs and pork patties") which incorporated the theme of 1960 film Never on Sunday, composed by Manos Hadjidakis. The song was presented to Kenneth Bager, owner of FLEX Records, who immediately saw its potential. Bager sought to find the right people to work on the track. He enlisted Ugandan rapper Al Agami to write the rap lyrics, while songwriters Richie and Jay Balmorian wrote the Spanish and English chorus. Danish singer Shirley arranged the backing vocals for the chorus. Finally, Kenneth Bager, Jan Elhøj, and Michael Pfundheller produced the track. Bager then presented "No Tengo Dinero" to FLEX Records' parent label, EMI, but they were not interested in the song. It was then re-produced by the Danish producers Cutfather and Joe Belmaati (of Cutfather & Joe), and finally EMI agreed to release the song. Before the release of the song, Kenneth Bager wanted to find two female backing singers for the Los Umbrellos project. Michael Pfundheller personally knew dancer Grith Højfeldt, while Mai-Britt Vingsøe was contacted through modelling agency Scandinavian Models. All three members of Los Umbrellos finally met at the cover shooting for the single.

Chart performance
"No Tengo Dinero" enjoyed chart success. In Denmark, the song peaked at number two on the Danish Singles Chart. It went on to sell 10,000 copies there. It reached number one on the Ö3 Austria Top 40, number two on the New Zealand Singles Chart, number four on the Swiss Singles Chart and number five on the Italian Singles Chart. The song also reached number 33 on the UK Singles Chart and appeared on three US Billboard charts—number 42 on the Hot 100, number 40 on the Mainstream Top 40 and number 27 on the Rhythmic chart. As of May 1998, the song had sold 412,000 copies in the United States.

As the next Los Umbrellos single, "Easy Come, Easy Go", did not follow the success of "No Tengo Dinero", the band was considered to be a one-hit wonder, and "No Tengo Dinero" their signature song.

Music video
The music video was recorded at the Safari Inn motel in Burbank, California. The video featured a guest appearance of adult film actor Ron Jeremy.

Track listings

Danish CD single
 "No Tengo Dinero" (C & J Radio Mix)
 "No Tengo Dinero" (Club Mix)
 "No Tengo Dinero" (Pumpin Dolls Remix)
 "No Tengo Dinero" (Pumpin Fiesta Loca)

European CD single
 "No Tengo Dinero" (Flex Mucho Mix) – 3:36
 "Theme from Los Umbrellos" – 3:20
 "No Tengo Dinero" (Extended Mucho Mix) – 4:13

European maxi-single
 "No Tengo Dinero" (C & J Radio Mix) – 3:36
 "No Tengo Dinero" (Club Mix) – 6:59
 "No Tengo Dinero" (C & J Extended Mix) – 4:13

UK maxi-single
 "No Tengo Dinero" (C & J Radio Mix) – 3:36
 "No Tengo Dinero" (Club Mix) – 6:59
 "No Tengo Dinero" (Pumpin Dolls Mix) – 4:03

US 7-inch vinyl
A. "No Tengo Dinero" (Flex Mucho Mix) – 3:36
B. "Hasta La Fuego" – 3:03

US CD single
 "No Tengo Dinero" (C & J Mix) – 3:36
 "Road to Carlos" – 4:30
 "Femme Fatale" – 5:23
 "Hasta La Fuego" – 3:03

Credits and personnel
Credits are adapted from CD single liner notes.
 Manos Hadjidakis – songwriter
 Al Agami – songwriter
 Richie Balmorian – songwriter
 Jay Balmorian – songwriter
 Kenneth Bager – recording, production, arrangement, executive producer
 Michael Pfundheller – recording, production, arrangement, mastering
 Jan Elhøj – recording, production, arrangement
 Cutfather & Joe – remix, additional production
 Mads Nilsson – engineer
 Lars Vissing – trumpet

Charts and sales

Weekly charts

Year-end charts

Certifications and sales

Release history

References

1997 songs
1997 debut singles
1998 singles
EMI Records singles
Number-one singles in Austria
Spanglish songs
Virgin Records singles